Dražkovce is a village and municipality in Martin District in the Žilina Region of northern Slovakia.

History
In historical records the village was first mentioned in 1260.

Geography
The municipality lies at an altitude of 430 metres and covers an area of 4.424 km². It has a population of 1000 people on 26 May 2018.

Genealogical resources

The records for genealogical research are available at the state archive "Statny Archiv in Bytca, Slovakia"

 Roman Catholic church records (births/marriages/deaths): 1730-1900 (parish A)
 Lutheran church records (births/marriages/deaths): 1784-1904 (parish B)

See also
 List of municipalities and towns in Slovakia

External links
https://web.archive.org/web/20071116010355/http://www.statistics.sk/mosmis/eng/run.html
Surnames of living people in Drazkovce

Villages and municipalities in Martin District